Tatvan is a city on the western shore of Lake Van, in Bitlis Province in eastern Turkey. It is the seat of Tatvan District. Its population is 79,214 (2021), making it the most populous municipality of the province. The current mayor is Mehmet Emin Geylani (AKP).

The district is fully Kurdish.

History 
The citadel at Eski Tatvan possibly dates back to the Urartian period; it was used until at least the 17th century. Sayf al-Dawla, the Hamdanid emir of Aleppo, visited Tatvan in 939/40; while he was here, he received the submission of the Armenian prince Ashot III of Taron. The town was historically a stage on the route from Van to Bitlis. By the 20th century, though, Tatvan had dwindled to a mere village, little more than "a cluster of houses by a jetty". It only developed back into a town until transport links improved around mid-century, with the construction of the railway in the 1950s and the improvement of the road to Van in 1964. In the 1980s, T.A. Sinclair wrote that the Denizcilik Bankası (Shipping Company) ran a good hotel on the south side of town, which was often full; the other hotels at the time, he wrote, were in the town center and were not good.

Transport 
The Tatvan Pier railway station, which is the eastern terminus of the railway line between Ankara and Teheran, with freight and passenger trains. It is connected eastwards to Van, 100 km away, and westwards to the rest of Turkey, by State Road D300. There is also a train ferry across the lake Van. The ferry was upgraded in 2015.

There is no railway around the lake to Van; it is intended eventually to build one but to date there are no plans. This would actually create an unbroken rail link between Europe and the Indian subcontinent, as Van is effectively the western terminus of the Iranian railway network.

There is a bus station about 500 meters from the train station.

Climate

See also 
 Turkish State Railways
 Islamic Republic of Iran Railways

References

External links 

 Mayor's web site
 Tatvan in brief

Tatvan District
Towns in Turkey
Populated places in Bitlis Province
Kurdish settlements in Bitlis Province